Vrbatův Kostelec is a municipality and village in Chrudim District in the Pardubice Region of the Czech Republic. It has about 400 inhabitants.

Administrative parts
Villages of Cejřov, Habroveč and Louka are administrative parts of Vrbatův Kostelec.

References

External links

Villages in Chrudim District